"Blue Bayou" is a song written by Roy Orbison and Joe Melson and sung by Orbison.

Blue Bayou may also refer to:

Blue Bayou and Dixie Landin' a water/amusement park in Baton Rouge, Louisiana
The Blue Bayou Restaurants operated within Disneyland and Tokyo Disneyland
 Blue Bayou, a 1990 film directed by Karen Arthur
 Blue Bayou (film), a 2021 film directed by Justin Chon
A short film on the Disney animated film Make Mine Music